Jacksen Baker Pierce (24 November 1894 – 23 May 1939) was an American writer who wrote and published numerous newspaper articles and short stories in the San Francisco Bay Area from 1912 to 1930. In 1931, he left San Francisco in search of inspiration. In 1933, after traveling the United States for roughly two years, he bought a small house in Crescent City, California, near modern day Pelican Bay State Prison. On May 22, 1939, he and two other men took a small fishing vessel out to sea. The following morning Pierce, and one of the two crew-mates, was found dead on a nearby beach. The circumstances and cause of Pierce's death remains a mystery.

Early life 
Jacksen Pierce was born at the University of California, San Francisco Medical Center on November 24, 1894.

1894 births
1939 deaths
American short story writers